The Moss Landing Power Plant is a natural gas powered electricity generation plant located in Moss Landing, California, United States, at the midpoint of Monterey Bay. Its large stacks are landmarks, visible throughout the Monterey Bay Area. The plant is owned and operated by Houston-based Dynegy and currently has a generation capacity of 1020 MW (net) from its two combined cycle generation units. It was once the largest power plant in the state of California, with a generation capacity of 2560 MW, before its two large supercritical steam units were retired in 2016.

It is to be the site of a new battery storage power station for grid battery storage of over 567 MW / 2,270 MWh of power, potentially the world's largest when completed.

History
In 1949, Pacific Gas & Electric (PG&E) began construction on the Moss Landing Power Plant. Five natural gas and oil powered steam units were built during the 1950s. Commercial generation started in 1950 with a capacity of 613 MW.

In 1964, the construction of two additional units began (6 and 7), with two new  stacks.

In 1995, the original five units were retired, and in 1997 PG&E let the permits lapse for these units.

As part of the Deregulation of Utilities in California, PG&E sold the plant to Duke Energy (DENA) in 1998. To comply with more restrictive pollution regulations, units 6 and 7 were upgraded in 1998 with a selective catalytic reduction unit and digital control systems.

Starting in 2000, the eight  stacks and 19 fuel oil storage tanks were removed, and two new units were built on the former site. The new units 1 and 2 were brought online in 2002. They are combined cycle units, 50% more efficient than the other units, because they use two turbines: first, a pair of 170 MW gas turbines, then a 190 MW steam turbine, for a total of 530 MW each. When completed in 2002, the plant was the largest power plant in California by capacity, at 2560 MW.

In 2006, having invested over half a billion dollars in upgraded capacity, efficiency and emission control, Duke Energy sold the plant to LS Power Equity Partners.
Dynegy then purchased the plant in April 2007 along with other assets of LS partners.

In 2015, a transmission tower collapsed at the power plant, causing a major Monterey County area power outage.

On December 31, 2016, Dynegy retired supercritical steam units 6 and 7 as they were no longer economically competitive. However, Dynegy continues to maintain the permit on these units.

In February 2017, independent power producer Dynegy, Inc. announced that it may close the gas plant, due to market conditions resulting from a glut of wholesale electricity capacity in California making it difficult to operate profitably. By 2018, California had 7,000 MW of surplus generating capacity, but a similar amount (mostly ocean cooled) would be retired by 2021. The glut in electricity capacity is partially a result of policies which guarantee utilities like PG&E (a regulated monopoly) a return on investment for building new power plants, even when they are not needed. Independent power producers like Dynegy, on the other hand, do not have a guaranteed return on their investment. Power production has dropped considerably, reducing taxes paid to Monterey County.

Grid connection
The plant has power lines that connect it to Path 15, and interconnections like Path 26 and Path 66 that allow power to flow to far-away regions. The plant is also connected to local loads and the San Jose region by transmission lines.

Gas units
Both the supercritical units and the combined cycle units use once-through cooling.

Supercritical Steam Units 6 and 7
Units 6 and 7 used supercritical steam. These units were retired at the end of 2016. At the end of their life, units 6 and 7 were typically operated as peaking units when demand for electricity was highest. In 2016, the last year of operation, they only operated approximately 3% of the time.

The generation process for units 6 and 7 starts with natural gas injected at one end of the boiler to be burned. Primary water is injected at the other end of the boiler to receive the heat produced. The gas simply comes from a natural gas pipeline, and combustion products go up the stack and into the atmosphere. Water has a much more complicated path, and consists of two distinct systems: coolant water and primary (steam-generating) water. Cooling water is pumped out of the Monterey Bay or the nearby Elkhorn Slough. Then it is purified, used to cool down the water coming from the turbines, and discharged into the ocean. Steam for the turbines is created from the primary water flow, which is preheated before entering the boiler. From the boiler, the superheated steam is directed into a first turbine working at high pressure, then into a low pressure turbine. The turbines drive the generators.

Combined Cycle Units 1 and 2
Combustion products drive the gas turbines directly. First, air is drawn from the air intake to the compressor (driven by the turbine axle), then it is burned with natural gas in the combustion chamber. The hot combustion gasses then go through the actual turbine (driving the axle). From a thermodynamic standpoint, this is the standard Brayton cycle. Because the gas turbine does not transfer energy from the combustion process to the turbine via steam, it avoids the cost, energy loss and environmental impact of the primary water cycle.

At the output of the gas turbines, some of the remaining energy (heat) in the exhaust gas is recovered through a heat exchanger and transferred to water that feeds a steam turbine, similar to units 6 and 7.

On a smaller scale than the supercritical units, units 1 and 2 are also more flexible, with a start-up time of only an hour, against 24 hours for units 6 and 7.

Battery storage
Utilities in California are required by a 2013 law to provide significant battery storage by 2024.

Vistra 500 kV
On June 29, 2018, Vistra Energy, which merged with Dynegy on April 9, 2018, announced that it will develop a 300 MW / 1,200 MWh energy storage system to be located at Moss Landing, using the existing turbine building and existing interconnection from units 6 and 7, connecting to the 500 kV grid. Vistra Energy expected the energy storage system to begin commercial operation by the end of 2020, pending receipt of approval from California Public Utilities Commission (CPUC). This would be the largest lithium-ion battery energy storage system in the world. The project began construction in December 2019, and Phase 1 began operating at the end of 2020. It is made of LG JH4 cells in TR1300 racks in two storeys in the old turbine hall. Phase 2 adding a further 100 MW / 400 MWh was completed in August 2021, bringing total capacity to 400 MW / 1,600 MWh. In September 2021, Phase 1 was shut down after a high temperature event caused by a leak in a liquid cooling hose, while Phase 2 kept operating. In February 2022, Phase 1 remained offline while Phase 2 also went offline after a sprinkler event. Most of the facility was back in operation as of July 2022.

An expansion to 1,500 MW / 6,000 MWh (also connecting to the 500 kV grid) was approved in August 2020, but not decided.

Elkhorn 115 kV
Utilities in California are required by a 2013 law to provide significant battery storage by 2024. Pacific Gas & Electric (PG&E) asked the CPUC to approve four energy storage projects located at Moss Landing including another large lithium-ion battery storage system of 182.5 MW / 730 MWh ("Elkhorn") to be provided by Tesla and owned and operated by PG&E, connecting to the regional 115 kV grid.

The project is designed to improve energy reliability and to allow for more renewable energy sources to be used at the Moss Landing site by increasing electricity storage available in California. The project also aims to save costs by reducing PG&E's reliance on peaker power plants that come online during periods of increased demand.

On July 3, 2019, in accordance with the California Environmental Quality Act, the County of Monterey Resource Management Agency published a Mitigated Negative Declaration, detailing actions that must be taken to mitigate potential environmental impacts of the project. The report concluded that the project would have a "Less than Significant Impact" on the environment, assuming the correct mitigating actions were taken. Specifically, it was found that mitigating actions were required to minimize the environmental impact of the project on "biological resources" such as wildlife habitat, and on "cultural resources", especially culturally-significant archaeological sites at the proposed location of the Megapack deployment.

The project was subsequently opened to public submissions on its environmental impact. California Unions for Reliable Energy argued that the County of Monterey failed to meet the standards of the California Environmental Quality Act when performing its environmental assessment. This same union group, with the same legal representation, used similar arguments against the California Flats solar project in order for organized labor to get concessions from the developer.

In February 2020, the Monterey County Planning Commission unanimously approved the project, which was initially scheduled to start construction in late March and be complete by 2021. However, the COVID-19 pandemic in California and subsequent stay-at-home order forced the project to be delayed. Construction began in July 2020, commissioned in April 2022, and inaugurated in June 2022.

See also

Energy in California
List of power stations in California
List of energy storage projects

References

Natural gas-fired power stations in California
Buildings and structures in Monterey County, California
Monterey Bay
Energy infrastructure completed in 1949
1949 establishments in California
Vistra Corp